Adama Traoré (born 28 June 1995), also known as Adama Noss Traoré, is a Malian professional footballer who plays as a midfielder for Hull City and the Mali national team.

After winning the Golden Ball as best player at the 2015 FIFA U-20 World Cup, he made his senior debut for Mali. He represented the country at the Africa Cup of Nations in 2017 and 2019.

Club career

Mali and Lille
Born in Bamako, Traoré joined his hometown's JMG Academy at the age of 12 in 2007. Five years later he joined Malian Première Division club AS Bakaridjan where he was only able to play three games before he got injured.

In January 2014, Traoré signed for Ligue 1 club Lille and was immediately loaned out to Belgian Second Division club Royal Mouscron-Péruwelz. He made his Ligue 1 debut on 24 September 2014, in a 1–0 away defeat against Nice. On 7 January 2015, he scored his first competitive goal at senior level for Lille in a 1–0 home-league win over Thonon Évian Savoie F. C.

Monaco
On 10 July 2015, Traoré joined AS Monaco on a four-year deal worth €14 million. On 4 August, he made his UEFA Champions League debut in a 4–0 win against Young Boys in the third qualifying round, coming on as an 80th-minute substitute for Mario Pašalić.

In January 2017, Traoré was loaned out until the end of the season to Primeira Liga side Rio Ave FC. He played seven games for the team from Vila do Conde, and scored the only goal of their win at Boavista on 1 April.

In January 2019, he was loaned out for the same duration to Belgian First Division A side Cercle Brugge KSV. On 31 August, he went on a season-long loan to fellow Ligue 1 club Metz. He scored his first goal for them on 23 November, equalising in a 1–1 home draw with Reims.

Hatayspor
On 11 September 2020, Traoré moved to Hatayspor of the Turkish Süper Lig, on a two-year deal with the option of a third.

Hull City
On 1 September 2022, Traoré signed for EFL Championship club Hull City on a two-year deal. He made his debut for Hull City on 25 February 2023, coming on as a 78th-minute substitute for Greg Docherty, in a 1–0 loss away to Bristol City.

International career
Traoré was part of the Mali under-20 team who participated in the 2015 FIFA U-20 World Cup in New Zealand. During the competition, he scored four goals and had three assists, and helped Mali win the bronze medal and earned himself the Adidas Golden Ball as the best player in the competition.

On 9 October 2015, Traoré made his national team debut in a 4–1 friendly win over Burkina Faso. On 4 September 2016, he scored his first international goal in a 5–2 win against Benin in the 2017 Africa Cup of Nations qualification. On 4 January 2017, Traoré was named in Mali's 23-man squad for the 2017 Africa Cup of Nations in Gabon, and was unused as the team were eliminated in the group stage. Two years later, on 16 June 2019, he was named in Mali's 23-man squad for the 2019 Africa Cup of Nations in Egypt. On 24 June 2019, he scored in his side's 4–1 opening match win against Mauritania.

Personal life
Traoré was an international teammate of a player of the same name, who was born in the same month. The two were also at Metz at the same time. To distinguish between them, Traoré was also known as Adama Noss Traoré.

Career statistics

Scores and results list Mali's goal tally first, score column indicates score after each Traoré goal.

References

External links

1995 births
Living people
Sportspeople from Bamako
Association football midfielders
Malian footballers
Mali under-20 international footballers
Malian expatriate footballers
Ligue 1 players
Belgian Pro League players
Primeira Liga players
Süper Lig players
Lille OSC players
AS Monaco FC players
Royal Excel Mouscron players
Rio Ave F.C. players
Cercle Brugge K.S.V. players
FC Metz players
Hatayspor footballers
Hull City A.F.C. players
Malian expatriate sportspeople in France
Malian expatriate sportspeople in Belgium
Malian expatriate sportspeople in Monaco
Malian expatriate sportspeople in Portugal
Malian expatriate sportspeople in Turkey
Malian expatriate sportspeople in England
Expatriate footballers in France
Expatriate footballers in Belgium
Expatriate footballers in Monaco
Expatriate footballers in Portugal
Expatriate footballers in Turkey
Expatriate footballers in England
2017 Africa Cup of Nations players
2019 Africa Cup of Nations players
2021 Africa Cup of Nations players
Mali international footballers
21st-century Malian people